Carnival Music Company is an independent music publishing company located in Nashville, Tennessee.   Carnival was founded in 1997 by Travis Hill and Frank Liddell (Liddell produced albums for Miranda Lambert, David Nail, Lee Ann Womack, Brandi Carlile, Charlie Worsham, Jack Ingram, the Eli Young Band, and Kellie Pickler).  Carnival celebrated its fifteenth #1 song in 2017 with Darius Rucker's For The First Time. Carnival Music is the parent company to the record label, Carnival Recording Company.

Current writers
 Adam Wright
 Aubrie Sellers
 Brent Cobb
 David Nail
 Derik Hultquist
 Dustin Christensen
 Gretchen Peters
 Jedd Hughes
 Marla Cannon-Goodman
 Waylon Payne

Number one songs

Other hits

Other notable cuts

Past writers
 Adam Hood
 Annie Tate
 Blu Sanders
 Brent Rodgers
 Bruce Robison
 Carter Wood
 Charlie Pate
 Clint Ingersoll
 Craig Dillingham
 Dan Colehour
 David Grissom
 Eric Wilson
 Hailey Whitters
 Heather Little
 Luke Reed
 Mando Saenz
 Mark Irwin
 Natalie Hemby
 Phillip Coleman
 Rick Brantley
 Roman Candle
 Sam Tate
 Scooter Carusoe
 Shane Stockton
 Stephanie Lambring
 Madeleine Slate
 Rob Baird
 Troy Jones

References

 carnivalmusic.net
 http://blogs.tennessean.com/tunein/2010/03/19/publisher-and-producer-frank-liddell-talks-songwriting-of-yesterday-today-and-tomorrow/
 https://web.archive.org/web/20140314234651/http://members.nashvillesongwriters.com/news.php?viewStory=3369

External links
 carnivalmusic.net
 http://blogs.tennessean.com/tunein/2010/03/19/publisher-and-producer-frank-liddell-talks-songwriting-of-yesterday-today-and-tomorrow/

Music publishing companies of the United States
Publishing companies established in 1999
Companies based in Tennessee
1999 establishments in Tennessee